Proto-Norse (also called Ancient Nordic, Ancient Scandinavian, Ancient Norse, Primitive Norse, Proto-Nordic, Proto-Scandinavian and Proto-North Germanic) was an Indo-European language spoken in Scandinavia that is thought to have evolved as a northern dialect of Proto-Germanic in the first centuries CE. It is the earliest stage of a characteristically North Germanic language, and the language attested in the oldest Scandinavian Elder Futhark inscriptions, spoken from around the 2nd to the 8th centuries CE (corresponding to the late Roman Iron Age and the Germanic Iron Age). It evolved into the dialects of Old Norse at the beginning of the Viking Age around 800 CE, which later themselves evolved into the modern North Germanic languages (Faroese, Icelandic, the three Continental Scandinavian languages, and their dialects).

Phonology
Proto-Norse phonology probably did not differ substantially from that of Proto-Germanic. Although the phonetic realisation of several phonemes had probably changed over time, the overall system of phonemes and their distribution remained largely unchanged.

Consonants

  assimilated to a following velar consonant. It was  before a plain velar, and probably  before a labial-velar consonant.
 Unlike its Proto-Germanic ancestor , the phoneme  probably no longer had a velar place of articulation. It eventually disappeared except word-initially.
Plosives appeared when the consonants were lengthened (geminated), and also after a nasal consonant.
 The exact realisation of the phoneme , traditionally written as ʀ in transcriptions of runic Norse (not to be confused with the phonetic symbol  used in other languages), is unclear. While it was a simple alveolar sibilant in Proto-Germanic (as in Gothic), it eventually underwent rhotacization and merged with  towards the end of the runic period. The sound was still written with its own letter in runic Old East Norse around the end of the first millennium.

Vowels
The system of vowels differed somewhat more from that of Proto-Germanic than the consonants. Shortening of word-final vowels had eliminated the Proto-Germanic overlong vowels.

  had developed from  through a-mutation. It also occurred word-finally as a result of the shortening of Proto-Germanic .
 The long nasal vowels ,  and  occurred only before . Their presence was noted in the 12th-century First Grammatical Treatise, and they survive in modern Elfdalian.
 All other nasal vowels occurred only word-finally, although it is unclear whether they had retained their nasality in Proto-Norse or had already merged with the oral vowels.
 The back vowels probably had central or front allophones when  or  followed, as a result of i-mutation:
  > ,  > 
  > ,  >  (later)
  >  (later  or )
Its allophone was probably , later .
 Towards the end of the Proto-Norse period, stressed  underwent breaking, becoming a rising diphthong .
 Also towards the end of the Proto-Norse period, u-mutation began to take effect, which created rounded allophones of unrounded vowels.

Diphthongs

  was later rounded to  due to u-mutation.
  eventually underwent breaking to become the triphthong  (as in Proto-Balto-Slavic).
 As  occurred exclusively in environments with i-mutation, its realisation was probably fronted . This then developed further into , which then became .

Accent
Old Norse had a stress accent which fell on the first syllable, like its ancestor, Proto-Germanic. Several scholars have proposed that Proto-Norse also had a separate pitch accent, which was inherited from Proto-Indo-European and has evolved into the tonal accents of modern Swedish and Norwegian, which in turn have evolved into the stød of modern Danish. Another recently advanced theory is that each Proto-Norse long syllable and every other short syllable received stress, marked by pitch, eventually leading to the development of the Swedish and Norwegian tonal accent distinction. Finally, quite a number of linguists have assumed that even the first phonetic rudiments of the distinction did not appear until the Old Norse period.

Attestations

Runic inscriptions

The surviving examples of Proto-Norse are all runic inscriptions in the Elder Futhark. There are about 260 surviving Elder Futhark inscriptions in Proto-Norse, the earliest dating to the 2nd century.

Examples
 Øvre Stabu spearhead, Oppland, Norway. Second century , ON  "tester", cf. Norwegian  "try, test". Swedish  "finding" and  "find out". The word formation with a suffix  is evidence of Sievers' law.
 Golden Horn of Gallehus 2, South Jutland, Denmark 400 CE, "I, Hlewagastis of Holt, made the horn." Note again the  suffix
 Tune stone, Østfold, Norway, 400 CE. , I, Wiwaz, after Woduridaz bread-warden wrought. For me Woduridaz, the stone, three daughters prepared, the most noble of heirs.
 The Einang stone, near Fagernes, Norway, is dated to the 4th century. It contains the message  ([I, Go]dguest drew the secret), in O–N . The first four letters of the inscription have not survived and are conjectured, and the personal name could well have been Gudagasti or something similar.
 Kragehul spear, Denmark, c. 500 CE.  possibly, "I, Eril of Asgisl, was named Muha, ga-ga-ga mighty-ga (ga being most likely an abbreviation of indeterminable reference), (incomplete) hail I consecrate."
 The Björketorp Runestone, Blekinge, Sweden, is one of three menhirs, but is the only one of them where, in the 6th century, someone wrote a curse:  (Here, I have hidden the secret of powerful runes, strong runes. The one who breaks this memorial will be eternally tormented by anger. Treacherous death will hit him. I foresee perdition.)
 The Rö runestone, in Bohuslän, Sweden, was raised in the early 5th century and is the longest early inscription:  "I, Hrazaz/Hraþaz raised the stone ... Swabaharjaz with wide wounds. ... Stainawarijaz (Stoneguardian's) carved."

Loanwords
Numerous early Germanic words have survived with relatively little change as borrowings in Finnic languages. Some of these may be of Proto-Germanic origin or older still, but others reflect developments specific to Norse. Some examples (with the reconstructed Proto-Norse form):
 Estonian/Finnish  < * "king" (Old Norse)
 Finnish  "prince" < * "lord" (Old Norse )
 Finnish  "sick" < * "sore" (Old Norse )
 Estonian , Finnish  "cheese" < * (Old Norse )
 Estonian/Finnish  "sheep" < * "lamb" (Old Norse )
 Finnish  "pious" < * "prudent, wise, quick-minded" (Old Norse )
 Finnish  "poem, rune" < * "secret, mystery, rune" (Old Norse )
 Finnish  "garment" < * (Old Norse )
 Finnish  "wise" < * (Old Norse )

A very extensive Proto-Norse loanword layer also exists in the Sámi languages.

Other
Some Proto-Norse names are found in Latin works, like tribal names like Suiones (*, "Swedes"). Others can be conjectured from manuscripts such as Beowulf.

Evolution

Proto-Germanic to Proto-Norse
The differences between attested Proto-Norse and unattested Proto-Germanic are rather small. Separating Proto-Norse from Northwest Germanic can be said to be a matter of convention, as sufficient evidence from the remaining parts of the Germanic-speaking area (Northern Germany and the Netherlands) is lacking in a degree to provide sufficient comparison. Inscriptions found in Scandinavia are considered to be in Proto-Norse. Several scholars argue about this subject matter. Wolfgang von Krause sees the language of the runic inscriptions of the Proto-Norse period as an immediate precursor to Old Norse, but Elmer Antonsen views them as Northwest Germanic. 

One early difference shared by the West Germanic dialects is the monophthongization of unstressed diphthongs.

There is, however, no trace of that in the Elder Futhark runic inscriptions, so it can be safely assumed that the quality of this consonant must have changed before the devoicing, or the phoneme would not have been marked with a rune different from the sowilō rune used for s. In Old Swedish, the phonemic distinction between r and ʀ was retained into the 11th century, as shown by the numerous runestones from Sweden from then.

Proto-Norse to Old Norse
From 500 to 800, two great changes occurred within Proto-Norse. Umlauts appeared, which means that a vowel was influenced by the succeeding vowel or semivowel: Old Norse  (guest) came from PN  (guest).

The umlauts are divided into three categories: a-umlaut, i-umlaut and u-umlaut; the last was still productive in Old Norse. The first, however, appeared very early, and its effect can be seen already around 500, on the Golden Horns of Gallehus. The variation caused by the umlauts was itself no great disruption in the language. It merely introduced new allophones of back vowels if certain vowels were in following syllables. However, the changes brought forth by syncope made the umlaut-vowels a distinctive non-transparent feature of the morphology and phonology, phonemicising what were previously allophones.

Syncope shortened the long vowels of unstressed syllables; many shortened vowels were lost. Also, most short unstressed vowels were lost. As in PN, the stress accent lay on the first syllable words as PN * became ON  (cauldrons), PN  was changed into Old Norse  (horn) and PN  resulted in ON  (guest). Some words underwent even more drastic changes, like * which changed into ON  (hawk).

References

Further reading
 Michael Schulte: Urnordisch. Eine Einführung (2018). Praesens Verlag, Wien. .

External links
 General information
 Proto-Norse paradigms and links   (archived copy)

North Germanic languages
 
Prehistoric Scandinavia
Languages attested from the 2nd century
2nd-century establishments
Languages extinct in the 8th century
8th-century disestablishments in Europe